Anikó Kapócs (born 2 June 1967) is a Hungarian rower. She competed at the 1988 Summer Olympics and the 1992 Summer Olympics.

References

1967 births
Living people
Hungarian female rowers
Olympic rowers of Hungary
Rowers at the 1988 Summer Olympics
Rowers at the 1992 Summer Olympics
Sportspeople from Székesfehérvár